Elections in South Korea are held on a national level to select the President and the National Assembly. Local elections are held every four years to elect governors, metropolitan mayors, municipal mayors, and provincial and municipal legislatures.

The president is directly elected for a single five-year term by plurality vote. The National Assembly has 300 members elected for a four-year term, 253 in single-seat constituencies and 47 members by proportional representation. Each individual party willing to represent its policies in the National Assembly is qualified on the legislative (general) election if: i) the national party-vote reaches over 3% on proportional contest or ii) more than 5 members of the party are elected from each of their first-past-the-post election constituencies.

Voting

Eligibility 
All citizens over the age of 18 have the right to vote. According to Article 34  of the 'Immigration Control Act,' a non-Korean citizen registered in the relevant local constituency and who has had a resident visa for at least three years has the right to vote in local elections.

Voting methods

Election technology

Polling places are usually located in schools.  During the
absentee or early voting period, voters can vote at any polling place in the country.  On election day, voters may only vote at polling places in their registered constituency.  Korean voters mark paper ballots with a rubber stamp using red ink.  There is one race per ballot paper; if there are multiple offices up for election, ballot papers are colour-coded and voters are issued one ballot per race.

Korea uses a central count model.  After the polls close, ballot boxes are sealed and transported to the constituency's counting centre.  Traditionally ballots were hand-counted, and optical scanners have been adopted since 3rd local elections held on 13 June 2002. The scanners resemble cash sorter machines, sorting the ballots into stacks by how they are voted.  Stacks are then counted using machines resembling currency counting machines.

Korean elections have been praised as a model of best practice.  However, the legality of the introduction of optical scan technology has been challenged and there have been allegations of rigged counting.

Schedule

Election

Inauguration

Latest elections

2022 presidential election

2020  legislative election

2022 local election

Summary of past elections

Presidential elections

Legislative elections

Local elections
 2010 South Korean local elections
 2014 South Korean local elections
 2018 South Korean local elections
 2022 South Korean local elections

See also
 History of South Korea
 Constitution of South Korea
 Electoral calendar
 Electoral system

Notes

Further reading

External links
Overview of candidates, parties and outcomes of South Korean elections since 1952 (with minor flaws like 이시영 missing in the 1952 page and wrong year of Park's resignation in the 1960 page)